Noh Do-hee (Hangul: 노도희; born 13 December 1995) is a South Korean short track speed skater.

Two-time overall world junior champion Noh was called up to the South Korean national team for the 2014–15 season, and had two podium finishes in the 1500 metres at the 2014–15 World Cup events. At the 2015 World Short Track Speed Skating Championships, she won a gold medal as part of the South Korean 3000 metre relay team.

External links
 Noh Do-hee at ShorttrackOnLine.info

1995 births
Living people
South Korean female short track speed skaters
Asian Games gold medalists for South Korea
Asian Games medalists in short track speed skating
Short track speed skaters at the 2017 Asian Winter Games
Medalists at the 2017 Asian Winter Games
World Short Track Speed Skating Championships medalists
Universiade medalists in short track speed skating
Universiade gold medalists for South Korea
Competitors at the 2017 Winter Universiade
21st-century South Korean women